Madame Tussauds Hollywood is a wax museum and tourist attraction located on Hollywood Boulevard in Hollywood, California. It is the ninth location for the Tussauds franchise, which was set up by sculptor Marie Tussaud, and is located just west of the TCL Chinese Theatre (formerly Grauman's). Madame Tussauds is owned and operated by Merlin Entertainments.

History
The three-story museum was under construction for 1.5 years before finally opening in 2009. It features 125 wax figures of famous celebrities - the first ones made for the location were of singer Beyoncé and actor Jamie Foxx, at a cost of approximately $350,000 (USD) each. Each wax figure has its own placard placed on a wall in close physical proximity to it, containing information about the portrayed figure.  A few matching props have been placed near select figures for visitors to use while taking photos.

The biggest figure in the museum is King Kong. The figure sits inside the attraction's lobby.

Marilyn Monroe and Vin Diesel are among some of the figures used in the lobby to entice guests to enter the attraction.

Current figures

References

Hollywood
History museums in Hollywood, Los Angeles
Wax museums in the United States
Hollywood Boulevard